The Europe Prize is a premium established in 1955 by the Parliamentary Assembly of the Council of Europe. It is awarded each year to one or more municipalities that have made exceptional efforts to spread the ideal of European unity.

Winning cities

References 

European awards
Parliamentary Assembly of the Council of Europe
Awards established in 1955